Chinese Filipinos (also known as Filipino Chinese in the Philippines) are Filipinos of Chinese descent with ancestry mainly from Fujian province, but are born and raised in the Philippines. Chinese Filipinos are one of the largest overseas Chinese communities in Southeast Asia. Chinese immigration to the Philippines occurred mostly during the Spanish colonization of the islands between the 16th and 19th centuries, attracted by the lucrative trade of the Manila galleons and since the late 20th century. In 2013, according to the Senate of the Philippines, there were approximately 1.35 million ethnic (or pure) Chinese within the Philippine population, while Filipinos with any Chinese descent comprised 22.8 million of the population. However, the actual current figures are not known since the Philippine census does not usually take into account questions about ethnicity.

Chinese Filipinos are a well established middle class ethnic group and are well represented in all levels of Filipino society. Chinese Filipinos also play a leading role in the Philippine business sector and dominate the Philippine economy today. Most in the current list of the Philippines' richest each year comprise Taipan billionaires of Chinese Filipino background. Some in the list of the political families in the Philippines are also of Chinese Filipino background, meanwhile the bulk are also of Spanish-colonial-era Chinese mestizo (mestizo de Sangley) descent, of which, many families of such background also compose a considerable part of the Philippine population especially its bourgeois, who during the late Spanish Colonial Era in the late 19th century, produced a major part of the ilustrado intelligentsia of the late Spanish Colonial Philippines, that were very influential with the creation of Filipino nationalism and the sparking of the Philippine Revolution as part of the foundation of the First Philippine Republic and subsequent sovereign independent Philippines.

Identity
The term "Chinese Filipino" may or may not be hyphenated. The website of the organization Kaisa para sa Kaunlaran (Unity for Progress) omits the hyphen, adding that the former is the adjective where the latter is the noun, depending on whichever perspective logic one understands that identity. The Chicago Manual of Style and the APA, among others, also recommend dropping the hyphen. When used as an adjective as a whole, it may take on a hyphenated form or may remain unchanged.

There are various universally accepted terms used in the Philippines to refer to Chinese Filipinos:
Chinese (Filipino/; Philippine Hokkien , Mandarin )—generalized term referring to any and all Chinese people in or outside the Philippines in general regardless of nationality or place of birth.
Chinese Filipino, Filipino Chinese or Philippine Chinese (Philippine ; Filipino/; Philippine Hokkien , Mandarin )—refers to people with some level of Han Chinese ethnicity with Philippine nationality and to people of Han Chinese ethnicity with Chinese nationality (either PRC or ROC) or whichever nationality but were born or mainly raised in the Philippines. This also includes Chinese Filipinos who now live and/or were born overseas, but still have close ties to the community in the Philippines.
Hokkienese / Fukienese / Fujianese / Fookienese (Philippine Hokkien , Mandarin )—terms referring to Chinese Filipinos whose predominant ancestry is from Fujian Province in China, especially the Hokkien-speaking region in Southern Fujian. Chinese Filipinos of this background typically have Philippine Hokkien as a heritage language, though just as any Chinese Filipino may also normally speak Philippine English, Filipino/Tagalog or other Philippine languages (such as Visayan languages) and may also code-switch any and all of these languages, such as Taglish, Bislish, Hokaglish, etc.
Cantonese (Philippine Hokkien , Mandarin )—terms referring to Chinese Filipinos whose ancestry is from Guangdong Province in China, especially the Taishanese or Cantonese-speaking regions.
Chinese mestizo (Philippine ; Filipino/; Philippine Hokkien , Mandarin )—refers to people who are of mixed Han Chinese and indigenous Filipino ancestry, a common and historical phenomenon in the Philippines especially families tracing from the Spanish colonial times. Those with 75% Han Chinese ancestry or more are typically not considered to be characteristically mestizo. Many Chinese mestizos are still Chinese Filipinos, though some with more indigenous Filipino ancestry or family or have just had a very long family history of living and assimilating to life in the Philippines may no longer identify as Chinese Filipino.
Mainland Chinese, Mainlander (Filipino/; Philippine Hokkien , Mandarin )—refers to any PRC citizens from mainland China (PRC), especially those of Han Chinese ethnicity with Chinese nationality that were raised in China (PRC).
Taiwanese (Filipino/; Philippine Hokkien , Taiwanese Mandarin )—refers to ROC citizens from Taiwan (ROC), especially those of Han Chinese ethnicity with Republic of China (Taiwan) nationality that were raised in Taiwan (ROC).
Hongkonger (Filipino/; Philippine Hokkien , Mandarin , Cantonese )—refers to people from Hong Kong, especially those of Han Chinese ethnicity with Hong Kong (SAR) residency or Hong Kong British National (Overseas) status that were born or raised in Hong Kong (SAR) or British Hong Kong.
Macanese (Filipino/; Philippine Hokkien , Mandarin , Cantonese )—refers to people from Macau, especially those of Han Chinese ethnicity with Macau permanent residency that were born or raised in Macau (SAR) or Portuguese Macau.
Tornatrás or Torna atrás—obsolete term referring to people who are of varying mixtures of Han Chinese, Spanish and indigenous Filipino during the Spanish Colonial Period of the Philippines.
Sangley—obsolete term referring to people of unmixed Chinese ancestry, especially fresh first generation Chinese migrants, during the Spanish Colonial Period of the Philippines. The mixed equivalents were likewise the above terms, Mestizo de Sangley and Tornatrás.

Other terms being used with reference to China include:
華人 – Hoâ-jîn or Huárén—a generic term for referring to Chinese people, without implication as to nationality
華僑 – Hoâ-kiâo or Huáqiáo—Overseas Chinese, usually China-born Chinese who have emigrated elsewhere
華裔 – Hoâ-è or Huáyì—People of Chinese ancestry who were born in, residents of and citizens of another country

"Indigenous Filipino" or simply "Filipino", is used in this article to refer to the Austronesian inhabitants prior to the Spanish Conquest of the islands. During the Spanish Colonial Period, the term Indio was used.

However, intermarriages occurred mostly during the Spanish colonial period because Chinese immigrants to the Philippines up to the 19th century were predominantly male. It was only in the 20th century that Chinese women and children came in comparable numbers. Today, Chinese Filipino male and female populations are practically equal in numbers. These Chinese mestizos, products of intermarriages during the Spanish colonial period, then often opted to marry other Chinese or Chinese mestizos. Generally, Chinese mestizos is a term referring to people with one Chinese parent.

By this definition, the ethnically Chinese Filipino comprise 1.8% (1.35 million) of the population. This figure however does not include the Chinese mestizos who since Spanish times have formed a part of the middle class in Philippine society nor does it include Chinese immigrants from the People's Republic of China since 1949.

History

Early interactions
Ethnic Han Chinese sailed around the Philippine Islands from the 9th century onward and frequently interacted with the local Austronesian people. Chinese and Austronesian interactions initially commenced as bartering and items. This is evidenced by a collection of Chinese artifacts found throughout Philippine waters, dating back to the 10th century. Since Song dynasty times in China and precolonial times in the Philippines, evidence of trade contact can already be observed in the Chinese ceramics found in archaeological sites, like in Santa Ana, Manila.

Spanish colonization of the Philippines (16th century–1898)

When the Spaniards arrived in the Philippines, there was already a significant population of migrants from China all of whom were male due to the relationship between the barangays (city-states) of the island of Luzon and the Ming dynasty.

The first encounter of the Spanish authorities with the Chinese occurred when several Chinese pirates under the leadership of Limahong attacked and besieged the newly established capital of Manila in 1574. The pirates tried to capture the city but were defeated by the combined Spanish and native forces under the leadership of Juan de Salcedo in 1575. Almost simultaneously, the Chinese imperial admiral Homolcong arrived in Manila where he was well received. On his departure he took with him two priests, who became the first Catholic missionaries in China sent from the Philippines. This visit was followed by the arrival of Chinese ships in Manila in May 1603 bearing Chinese officials with the seal of the Ming Empire. This led to suspicions that the Chinese had sent a fleet to try to conquer the islands. However, seeing the city's strong defenses, the Chinese made no hostile moves. They returned to China without showing any particular motive for the journey and without either side mentioning the apparent motive. Fortifications of Manila were started, with a Chinese settler in Manila named Engcang, who offered his services to the governor. He was refused and a plan to massacre the Spaniards quickly spread among the Chinese inhabitants of Manila. The revolt was quickly crushed by the Spaniards, ending in a large-scale massacre of the non-Catholic Sangley in Manila. Throughout the Spanish Colonial Period, the China citizens who were mostly of mixed Arab, Iranian and Tanka trader descent called Sangley outnumbered the Spanish colonizers by ten to one due to extensive intermarriage with the native Filipinos, and at least on two occasions tried to seize power, but their revolts were quickly put down by joint forces composed of indigenous Filipinos, Japanese and Spanish.

Following the mostly unpleasant initial interaction with the Spaniards, most of the mixed raced Arab and Iranian Sangley in Manila and in the rest of the Philippines started to focus on retail trade and service industry in order to avoid massacres and forced deportations to China. The Spanish authorities started restricting the activities of the Chinese immigrants and confined them to the Parían near Intramuros. With low chances of employment and prohibited from owning land, most of them engaged in small businesses or acted as skilled artisans to the Spanish colonial authorities.

The Spanish authorities differentiated the Chinese immigrants into two groups: Parían (unconverted) and Binondo (converted). Many immigrants converted to Catholicism and due to the lack of Chinese women, intermarried with indigenous women and adopted Hispanized names and customs. The children of unions between indigenous Filipinos and Chinese were called Mestizos de Sangley or Chinese mestizos, while those between Spaniards and Chinese were called Tornatrás. The Chinese population originally occupied the Binondo area although eventually they spread all over the islands, and became traders, moneylenders and landowners.

Chinese mestizos as Filipinos
During the Philippine Revolution of 1898, Mestizos de Sangley (Chinese mestizos) would eventually refer to themselves as Filipino, which during that time referred to Spaniards born in the Philippines. The Chinese mestizos would later fan the flames of the Philippine Revolution. Many leaders of the Philippine Revolution themselves have substantial Chinese ancestry. These include Emilio Aguinaldo, Andrés Bonifacio, Marcelo del Pilar, Antonio Luna, José Rizal and Manuel Tinio.

Chinese mestizos in the Visayas
Sometime in the year 1750, an adventurous young man named Wo Sing Lok, also known as "Sin Lok" arrived in Manila, Philippines. The 12-year-old traveler came from Amoy, the old name for Xiamen, an island known in ancient times as "Gateway to China"—near the mouth of Jiulong "Nine Dragon" River in the southern part of Fujian Province.

Earlier in Manila, immigrants from China were herded to stay in the Chinese trading center called "Parian". After the Sangley Revolt of 1603, this was destroyed and burned by the Spanish authorities. Three decades later, Chinese traders built a new and bigger Parian near Intramuros.

For fear of a Chinese uprising similar to that in Manila, the Spanish authorities implementing the royal decree of Gov. Gen. Juan de Vargas dated July 17, 1679, rounded up the Chinese in Iloilo and hamletted them in the parian (now Avanceña Street). It compelled all local unmarried Chinese to live in the Parian and all married Chinese to stay in Binondo. Similar Chinese enclaves or "Parian" were later established in Camarines Sur, Cebu and Iloilo.

Sin Lok together with the progenitors of the Lacson, Sayson, Ditching, Layson, Ganzon, Sanson and other families who fled Southern China during the reign of the despotic Qing dynasty (1644–1912) in the 18th century and arrived in Maynilad; finally, decided to sail farther south and landed at the port of Batiano river to settle permanently in "Parian" near La Villa Rica de Arevalo in Iloilo.

American colonial era (1898–1946)
During the American colonial period, the Chinese Exclusion Act in the United States was also put into effect in the Philippines. Nevertheless, the Chinese were able to settle in the Philippines with the help of other Chinese Filipinos, despite strict American law enforcement, usually through "adopting" relatives from Mainland or by assuming entirely new identities with new names.

The privileged position of the Chinese as middlemen of the economy under Spanish colonial rule quickly fell, as the Americans favored the principalía (educated elite) formed by Chinese mestizos and Spanish mestizos. As American rule in the Philippines started, events in Mainland China starting from the Taiping Rebellion, Chinese Civil War and Boxer Rebellion led to the fall of the Qing dynasty, which led thousands of Chinese from Fujian Province in China to migrate en masse to the Philippines to avoid poverty, worsening famine and political persecution. This group eventually formed the bulk of the current population of unmixed Chinese Filipinos.

Formation of the Chinese Filipino identity (1946–1975)
Beginning in World War II, Chinese soldiers and guerrillas joined in the fight against the Japanese Imperial Forces during the Japanese Occupation in the Philippines (1941–1945). On April 9, 1942, many Chinese Filipino Prisoners of War were killed by Japanese Forces during the Bataan Death March after the fall of Bataan and Corregidor in 1942. Chinese Filipinos were integrated in the U.S. Armed Forces of the First & Second Filipino Infantry Regiments of the United States Army. After the Fall of Bataan and Corregidor in 1942, Chinese Filipinos joined as soldiers in a military unit of the Philippine Commonwealth Army under the U.S. military command as a ground arm of the Armed Forces of the Philippines (AFP) which started the battles between the Japanese Counter-Insurgencies and Allied Liberators from 1942 to 1945 to fight against the Japanese Imperial forces. Some Chinese Filipinos who joined as soldiers were integrated into the 11th, 14th, 15th, 66th & 121st Infantry Regiment of the U.S. Armed Forces in the Philippines – Northern Luzon (USAFIP-NL) under the military unit of the Philippine Commonwealth Army started the Liberation in Northern Luzon and aided the provinces of Ilocos Norte, Ilocos Sur, La Union, Abra, Mountain Province, Cagayan, Isabela and Nueva Vizcaya in attacking Imperial Japanese forces. Many Chinese Filipinos joined the guerrilla movement of the Philippine-Chinese Anti-Japanese guerrilla resistance fighter unit or Wha-Chi Movement, the Ampaw Unit under Colonel Chua Sy Tiao  and the Chinese Filipino 48th Squadron since 1942 to 1946 in attacking Japanese forces. Thousands of Chinese Filipino soldiers and guerrillas died of heroism in the Philippines from 1941 to 1945 during World War II. Thousands of Chinese Filipino veterans are interred in the Shrine of Martyr's Freedom of the Filipino Chinese in World War II located in Manila. The new-found unity between the ethnic Chinese migrants and the indigenous Filipinos against a common enemy – the Japanese, served as a catalyst in the formation of a Chinese Filipino identity who started to regard the Philippines as their home.

Chinese as aliens under the Marcos regime (1975–1986)
Under the administration of Ferdinand Marcos, Chinese Filipinos called "lao cao" (Philippine Hokkien , meaning "old people" or literally, "old monkey" (a comedic reference to the Monkey King (Sun Wukong) from the old famous Chinese classical novel, Journey to the West)), i.e., Chinese in the Philippines who acquired citizenship, referred only to those who arrived in the country before World War II. Those who arrived after the war were called the "jiu qiao" (Mandarin ). They were residents who came from China (also usually southern Fujian) via British Hong Kong, such as through North Point, Causeway Bay, or Kowloon Bay, between the 1950s to 1980s.

Chinese schools in the Philippines, which were governed by the Ministry of Education of the Republic of China (Taiwan), were transferred under the jurisdiction of the Philippine government's Department of Education. Virtually all Chinese schools were ordered closed or else to limit the time allotted for Chinese language, history and culture subjects from four hours to two hours and instead devote them to the study of Filipino languages and culture. Marcos' policies eventually led to the formal assimilation of the Chinese Filipinos into mainstream Filipino society, the majority were granted citizenship, under the administration of Corazon Aquino and Fidel Ramos.

Following the February 1986 People Power Revolution (EDSA 1), the Chinese Filipinos quickly gained national spotlight as Cory Aquino, a Tarlac Chinese mestiza from the influential Cojuangco family took up the Presidency.

Return of democracy (1986–2000)

Despite getting better protections, crimes against Chinese Filipinos were still present, the same way as crimes against other ethnic groups in the Philippines, as the country was still battling the lingering economic effects of the Marcos regime. All these led to the formation of the first Chinese Filipino organization, Kaisa Para Sa Kaunlaran, Inc. (Unity for Progress) by Teresita Ang-See which called for mutual understanding between the ethnic Chinese and the native Filipinos. Aquino encouraged free press and cultural harmony, a process which led to the burgeoning of the Chinese-language media During this time, the third wave of Chinese migrants came. They are known as the "xin qiao" (Mandarin ) , tourists or temporary visitors with fake papers, fake permanent residencies or fake Philippine passports that started coming starting the 1990s during the administration of Fidel Ramos and Joseph Estrada.

21st century (2001–present)
More Chinese Filipinos were given Philippine citizenship during the 21st century. Chinese influence in the country increased during the pro-China presidency of Gloria Arroyo. Businesses by Chinese Filipinos were said to have improved under Benigno Aquino's presidency, while mainland Chinese migration into the Philippines decreased due to Aquino's pro-Filipino and pro-American approach in handling disputes with China. "Xin qiao" Chinese migration from mainland China into the Philippines intensified from 2016 up to the present, due to controversial pro-China policies by the Rodrigo Duterte presidency, prioritizing Chinese POGO businesses.

The Chinese Filipino community have expressed concerns over the ongoing disputes between China and the Philippines, which majority preferring peaceful approaches to the dispute to safeguard their own private businesses.

Origins

Virtually most all Chinese Filipinos in the Philippines belong to Hokkien-speaking group of the Han Chinese ethnicity. Many Chinese Filipinos are either third, fourth or second generation or in general natural-born Philippine citizens who can still look back to their Chinese roots and have Chinese relatives both in China as well as in other Southeast Asian or Australasian or North American countries.

Hokkien (Fujianese / Hokkienese / Fukienese / Fookienese) people
Chinese Filipinos who have roots as Hokkien people (福建人/閩南人) predominantly have ancestors who came from Southern Fujian and usually speak or at least have Philippine Hokkien as heritage language. They form the bulk of Chinese settlers in the Philippines during or after the Spanish Colonial Period, and settled or spread primarily from Metro Manila and key cities in Luzon such as Angeles City, Baguio, Dagupan, Ilagan, Laoag, Lucena, Tarlac and Vigan, as well as in major Visayan and Mindanao cities such as Bacolod, Cagayan de Oro, Cotabato, Metro Cebu, Metro Davao, Dumaguete, General Santos, Iligan, Metro Iloilo, Ormoc, Tacloban, Tagbilaran and Zamboanga.

Of the Hokkien peoples, about 75% are from Quanzhou Prefecture (especially around Jinjiang City), 23% are from Zhangzhou Prefecture and 2% are from Xiamen City.

According to a study of around 30,000 gravestones in the Manila Chinese Cemetery which writes the birthplace or family ancestral origins of those buried there, 66.46% were from Jinjiang City (Quanzhou), 17.63% from Nan'an, Fujian (Quanzhou), 8.12% from Xiamen in general, 2.96% from Hui'an County (Quanzhou), 1.55% from Longxi County (now part of Longhai City, Zhangzhou), 1.24% from Enming (Siming District, Xiamen), 1.17% from Quanzhou in general, 1.12% from Tong'an District (Xiamen), 0.85% from Shishi City (Quanzhou), 0.58% from Yongchun County (Quanzhou) and 0.54% from Anxi County (Quanzhou).

The Hokkien-descended Chinese Filipinos currently dominate the light industry and heavy industry, as well as the entrepreneurial and real estate sectors of the Philippine economy. Many younger Hokkien-descended Chinese Filipinos are also entering the fields of banking, computer science, engineering, finance and medicine.

To date, most emigrants and permanent residents from Mainland China, as well as the vast majority of Taiwanese people in the Philippines are also of Hokkien background.

Teochews
Linguistically related to the Hokkien people are the Teochew (Philippine Hokkien  or in Mandarin ).

They migrated in large numbers to the Philippines during the Spanish Period to the main Luzon island of Philippines, but later on were eventually assimilated by intermarriage with the mainstream Hokkien.

The Teochews are often mistaken for being Hokkien.

Cantonese people
Chinese Filipinos who have roots as Cantonese people (Cantonese ) have ancestors who came from Guangdong Province and speak or at least have Cantonese or Taishanese as heritage language. They settled down in Metro Manila, as well as in major cities of Luzon such as Baguio City, Angeles City, Naga and Olongapo. Many also settled in the provinces of Northern Luzon (e.g., Benguet, Cagayan, Ifugao, Ilocos Norte) especially around Baguio.

The Cantonese people (Philippine Hokkien , Mandarin ) form roughly 1.2% of the unmixed ethnic Chinese population of the Philippines, with large numbers of descendants originally from either Taishan, Kaiping, Macau, Hong Kong, Canton (Guangzhou), or nearby areas transiting from either Macau, Hong Kong, Guangzhou (Canton). Many were/are not as economically prosperous as the Hokkien Chinese Filipinos. Barred from owning land during the Spanish Colonial Period, most Cantonese were into the service industry, working as artisans, miners, househelpers, bakers, shoemakers, metal workers, barbers, herbal physicians, porters (cargadores / coulis), soap makers and tailors. They also intermarried with other local Filipinos during the Spanish Colonial Era and many of their descendants are now assimilated as Chinese mestizos. There are also those that came during the American Colonial Period before WW2 especially in Baguio as part of the 700 Chinese (Cantonese) coolie laborers recruited from British Hong Kong by the British managing the Manila Railroad Company for the construction of the Benguet Road (Kennon Road) along with the Japanese (who also later stayed to become Japanese Filipinos) and other lowland Filipinos. In Baguio, Cantonese Chinese were known for their carpentry, masonry, and culinary skills, where they were employed in hotels and places like Camp John Hay and they set up businesses like restaurants, grocery stores, bazaars, hardware stores, sari-sari stores and dried fish stalls. The logging, mining, and agribusiness industry during the 1930s in Baguio was also big among the Cantonese Chinese Filipinos there and it was only at such time during 1930s and after WW2 when Hokkien Chinese Filipinos started to establish themselves in Baguio. Presently, they are into small-scale entrepreneurship and in education. There are also about 30 or so Filipino Cantonese associations in the Philippines, such as the Baguio Filipino Cantonese Association CAR (BFCA-CAR), which was merged from The Baguio Cantonese Association and the Brotherhood of Filipino-Cantonese Mestizos during 1999. There are also schools such as Baguio Patriotic School and Manila Patriotic School.

Others
There are also some ethnic Chinese from neighboring Asian countries and territories, most notably from Malaysia, Indonesia, Vietnam, Taiwan and Hong Kong who are naturalized Philippine citizens and have since formed part of the Chinese Filipino community. Many of them are also Hokkien speakers, with a sizeable number of Cantonese and Teochew speakers.

Temporary resident Chinese businessmen and envoys include people from Beijing, Shanghai and other major cities and provinces throughout China.

Demographics

 The figure above denotes first-generation Chinese mestizos – namely, those with one Chinese and one Filipino parent. This figure does not include those who have less than 50% Chinese ancestry, who are mostly classified as "Filipino".

The exact number of all Filipinos with some Chinese ancestry is unknown. Various estimates have been given from the start of the Spanish Colonial Period up to the present ranging from as low as 1% to as large as 18–27%. The National Statistics Office does not conduct surveys of ethnicity.

According to a research report by historian Austin Craig who was commissioned by the United States in 1915 to ascertain the total number of the various races of the Philippines, the pure Chinese, referred to as Sangley, number around 20,000 (as of 1918), and that around one-third of the population of Luzon have partial Chinese ancestry. This comes with a footnote about the widespread concealing and de-emphasising of the exact number of Chinese in the Philippines.

Another source dating from the Spanish Colonial Period shows the growth of the Chinese and the Chinese mestizo population to nearly 10% of the Philippine population by 1894.

Language

The vast majority (74.5%) of Chinese Filipinos speak Filipino as their native language. Most Chinese Filipinos (77%) still retain the ability to understand and speak Hokkien as a second or third language.

The use of Hokkien as a first language is seemingly confined to the older generation and to Chinese Filipino families living in traditional Chinese Filipino centers, such as Caloocan, Davao Chinatown, and the Binondo district of Manila. In part due to the increased adoption of Philippine nationality during the Marcos era, most Chinese Filipinos born from the 1970s to the mid-1990s tend to use English, Filipino (Tagalog) and perhaps other Philippine regional languages, which they frequently code-switch between as Taglish or mix together with Hokkien as Hokaglish. Among the younger generation (born from the mid-1990s onward), the preferred language is often English besides also, of course, knowing Filipino (Tagalog) and, in most regions of the Philippines, other regional languages. Recent arrivals from Mainland China or Taiwan, despite coming mostly from traditionally Hokkien-speaking areas, typically now use Mandarin among themselves.

Unlike other overseas Chinese communities in Southeast Asia, which feature an assortment of dialect groups, Chinese Filipinos descend overwhelmingly from Hokkien-speaking regions in Southern Fujian. Hence, Hokkien remains the main heritage language among Chinese Filipinos. Mandarin, however, is perceived as the most prestigious Chinese language, so it is taught in Chinese Filipino schools and used in all official and formal functions within the Chinese Filipino community despite the fact that very few Chinese Filipinos are conversant in Mandarin or have it as a heritage language.

For the Chinese mestizos, Spanish used to be the most important prestige language and the preferred first language at the turn of the century, especially during the Spanish colonial era. Starting from the American period, the use of Spanish gradually decreased and is now completely replaced by either English or Filipino.

Hokkien / Fukien / Fookien (Philippine Hokkien)

Since most Chinese Filipinos in the Philippines trace their ancestry to Southern Fujian in Fujian Province of Mainland China, the Hokkien language, specifically the Philippine Hokkien dialect, is the heritage language of most Chinese Filipinos. Currently, it is typically the elderly and those of the older generations, such as the Silent Generation, the Baby boomer generation and part of Generation X, who speak Philippine Hokkien as their first or second language, especially as first- or second-generation Chinese Filipinos. The younger generations, such as part of Generation X and most Millennials and Generation Z youth, sparsely use Hokkien as a second or third language and even more seldom as a first language. This is due to Hokkien nowadays only being used and heard within family households and no longer being taught at schools. As a result, most of the youth can either only understand Hokkien by ear or do not know it at all, using instead English, Filipino (Tagalog) and in some cases one or more other Philippine languages.

The variant of Hokkien spoken in the Philippines, Philippine Hokkien, is locally called Lannang-ue (Philippine Hokkien ). Philippine Hokkien is mutually intelligible to a certain degree with other Hokkien variants in mainland China, Taiwan, Malaysia, Singapore, Indonesia, etc. and is particularly close to the variant spoken in Quanzhou, especially around Jinjiang. Its unique features include its conservative nature that preserves old vocabulary and pronunciations, the presence of a few loanwords from Philippine Spanish and Filipino and frequent code-switching with Philippine English, Filipino/Tagalog and other Philippine languages (such as Visayan languages), excessive use of shortenings and colloquial words (e.g., "pīⁿ-chhù" [病厝]: literally, "sick-house", instead of the Taiwanese Hokkien term "pīⁿ-īⁿ" [病院] to refer to "hospital" or "chhia-thâu" [車頭]: literally, "car-head", instead of the Taiwanese Hokkien term "su-ki" [司機] to refer to a "driver") and use of vocabulary terms from various variants of Hokkien, such as from the Quanzhou, Amoy (Xiamen) and Zhangzhou dialects of the Hokkien language.

Mandarin

Mandarin is currently the subject and medium of instruction for teaching Standard Chinese (Mandarin) class subjects in Chinese Filipino schools in the Philippines. However, since the language is rarely used outside of the classroom besides jobs and interactions related to Mainland China and Taiwan, most Chinese Filipinos would be hard-pressed to converse in Mandarin.

As a result of longstanding influence from the ROC Ministry of Education of the Overseas Chinese Affairs Council of the Republic of China (Taiwan) since the early 1900s up to 2000, the Mandarin variant (known in many schools in Hokkien ) taught and spoken in many older Chinese Filipino schools in the Philippines closely mirrors that of Taiwanese Mandarin, using Traditional Chinese characters and the Zhuyin phonetic system (known in many schools in Hokkien ) being taught, though in recent decades Simplified Chinese characters and the Pinyin phonetic system were also introduced from China and Singapore. Some Chinese Filipino schools now also teach Mandarin in Simplified characters with the Pinyin system, modeled after those in China and Singapore. Some schools teach both or either of the systems.

Cantonese and Taishanese
Currently, there are still a few minority Cantonese Chinese Filipino families that still privately speak Cantonese or Taishanese at home or in their circles, but many who still interact with the overall Chinese Filipino community have also learned to speak Philippine Hokkien for business purposes due to Hokkien's status as a community lingua franca within the Chinese Filipino community. Due to the relatively small population of Chinese Filipinos who are or claim to be of Cantonese ancestry, most Filipinos of Cantonese ancestry, such as Spanish-colonial-era Chinese mestizos (Mestizos de Sangley) that originally trace back to Macau or Canton (Guangzhou), especially the younger generations thereof, do not speak Cantonese or Taishanese anymore and can only speak the local languages, such as Filipino (Tagalog), English and other Philippine languages such as Ilocano, Cebuano, etc. Some families of Cantonese ancestry within the Chinese Filipino community also speak Philippine Hokkien with their family, especially those that intermarried with Chinese Filipinos of Hokkien ancestry. There may also be some Chinese Filipino families of Hokkien ancestry that speak Cantonese due to a family history of having lived in Hong Kong, such as around the districts of North Point, Kowloon Bay or Causeway Bay, during the Cold War period, when many families fled the communist advance to British Hong Kong and then later to countries in Southeast Asia such as the Philippines or Indonesia.

English

Just like most other Filipinos, the vast majority of Chinese Filipinos who grew up in the Philippines are fluent in English, especially Philippine English (which descends from American English) as taught in schools in the Philippines. They are usually natively bilingual or even multilingual since both English and Filipino are required subjects in all grades of all schools in the Philippines, as English serves as an important formal prestige language in Philippine society. Due to this, around 30% of all Chinese Filipinos, mostly those belonging to the younger generations, use English as their preferred first language. Others have it as their second language or third language, being natively bilingual or multilingual together with Filipino and sometimes one or more other Philippine languages.

Filipino and other Philippine languages

The majority of Chinese Filipinos who were born, were raised, or have lived long enough in the Philippines are at least natively bilingual or multilingual. Along with English, Chinese Filipinos typically speak Filipino (Tagalog) and, in non-Tagalog regions, the dominant regional Philippine language(s), such as the Visayan languages (Cebuano, Hiligaynon, Waray, etc.) spoken in the Visayas and Mindanao.

Many Chinese Filipinos, especially those living in the provinces, speak the regional language(s) of their province as their first language(s), if not English or Filipino. Just like most other Filipinos, Chinese Filipinos frequently code-switch either with Filipino or Tagalog and English, known as Taglish, or with other regional provincial languages, such as Cebuano and English, known as Bislish. This frequent code-switching has produced a trilingual mix with the above Philippine Hokkien, known as Hokaglish, which mixes Hokkien, Tagalog and English. However, in provinces where Tagalog is not a native language, the equivalent dominant regional language(s) may be mixed instead of Tagalog or along with Tagalog in a mix of four or more languages due to the normalcy of code-switching and multilingualism as part of Philippine society.

Spanish

During the Spanish colonial period and subsequent few decades before its replacement by English, Spanish used to be the formal prestige language of Philippine society and hence, Sangley Chinese (Spanish-era unmixed Chinese), Chinese mestizos (Spanish-era mixed Chinese Filipinos) and Tornatras mestizos (Spanish-era mixed Chinese-Spanish or Chinese-Spanish-native Filipinos) also learned to speak Spanish throughout the Spanish colonial period to the early to mid 20th century when its role was eventually eclipsed by English and later largely dissipated from mainstream Philippine society. Most of the elites of Philippine society during the Spanish colonial era and American colonial era were Spanish mestizos or Chinese mestizos, which later intermixed together to an unknown degree and now frequently treated as one group known as Filipino mestizos. Due to this history in the Philippines, many of the older generation Chinese Filipinos (mainly those born before WWII), whether pure or mixed, can also understand some Spanish, due to its importance in commerce and industry. The Chinese community of the Philippines during the Spanish colonial era used to also speak a sort of Spanish pidgin variety known as "Caló Chino Español" or "Kastilang tindahan". This was especially the case with the local Sangley Chinese that intermarried during Spanish colonial times. They brought forth Spanish-speaking Chinese Mestizos of varying proficiency, from the accented pidgin Spanish of the new Chinese immigrants to the fluent Spanish of Sangley Chinese old-timers.

Religion

Chinese Filipinos are unique in Southeast Asia in being overwhelmingly Christian (83%). but many families, especially Chinese Filipinos in the older generations still practice traditional Chinese religions. Almost all Chinese Filipinos, including the Chinese mestizos but excluding recent migrants from either Mainland China or Taiwan, had or will have their marriages in a Christian church.

Roman Catholicism

The majority (70%) of Christian Chinese Filipinos are Catholic. Many Catholic Chinese Filipinos still tend to practice the traditional Chinese religions alongside Catholicism, due to the recent openness of the Church in accommodating Chinese beliefs such as ancestor veneration.

Unique to the Catholicism of Chinese Filipinos is the religious syncretism that is found in Chinese Filipino homes. Many have altars bearing Catholic images such as the Santo Niño (Child Jesus) as well as statues of the Buddha and Taoist gods. It is not unheard of to venerate the Blessed Virgin Mary, saints, or the dead using joss sticks and otherwise traditional offerings, much as one would have done for Guan Yin or Mazu.

Protestantism

Approximately 13% of all Christian Chinese Filipinos are Protestants.

Many Chinese Filipino schools are founded by Protestant missionaries and churches.

Chinese Filipinos comprise a large percentage of membership in some of the largest evangelical churches in the Philippines, many of which are also founded by Chinese Filipinos, such as the Christian Gospel Center, Christ's Commission Fellowship, United Evangelical Church of the Philippines and the Youth Gospel Center.

In contrast to Roman Catholicism, Protestantism forbids traditional Chinese practices such as ancestor veneration, but allows the use of meaning or context substitution for some practices that are not directly contradicted in the Bible (e.g., celebrating the Mid-Autumn Festival with moon cakes denoting the moon as God's creation and the unity of families, rather than the traditional Chinese belief in Chang'e). Many also had ancestors already practicing Protestantism while still in China.

Unlike native and mestizo Filipino-dominated Protestant churches in the Philippines which have very close ties with North American organizations, most Protestant Chinese Filipino churches instead sought alliance and membership with the Chinese Congress on World Evangelization, an organization of Overseas Chinese Christian churches throughout Asia.

Chinese traditional religions and practices
A small number of Chinese Filipinos (2%) continue to practise traditional Chinese religions solely. Mahayana Buddhism, specifically, Chinese Pure Land Buddhism, Taoism and ancestral worship (including Confucianism) are the traditional Chinese beliefs that continue to have adherents among the Chinese Filipino.

Buddhist and Taoist temples can be found where the Chinese live, especially in urban areas like Manila. Veneration of the Guanyin (觀音), known locally as Kuan-im either in its pure form or seen a representation of the Virgin Mary is practised by many Chinese Filipinos. The Chinese Filipino community also established indigenous religious denominations like Bell Church (钟教), which is a syncretic religion with ecumenical and interfaith in orientation. There are several prominent Chinese temples like Seng Guan Temple (Buddhist) in Manila, Cebu Taoist Temple in Cebu City and Lon Wa Buddhist Temple in Davao City.

Around half (40%) of all Chinese Filipinos regardless of religion still claim to practise ancestral worship. The Chinese, especially the older generations, have the tendency to go to pay respects to their ancestors at least once a year, either by going to the temple, or going to the Chinese burial grounds, often burning incense and bringing offerings like fruits and accessories made from paper.

Others
There are very few Chinese Filipino Muslims, most of whom live in either Mindanao or the Sulu Archipelago and have intermarried or assimilated with their Moro neighbors. Many of them have attained prominent positions as political leaders. They include Datu Piang, Abdusakur Tan and Michael Mastura, among such others.

Others are also members of the Iglesia ni Cristo, Jehovah's Witnesses or the Church of Jesus Christ of Latter-day Saints. Some younger generations of Chinese Filipinos also profess to be atheists.

Education

There are 150 Chinese schools that exist throughout the Philippines, slightly more than half of which operate in Metro Manila. Chinese Filipino schools typically include the teaching of Standard Chinese (Mandarin), among other school class subjects, and have an international reputation for producing award-winning students in the fields of science and mathematics, most of whom reap international awards in mathematics, computer programming, and robotics Olympiads.

History

The first school founded specifically for the Chinese in the Philippines, the Anglo-Chinese School (now known as Tiong Se Academy) was opened in 1899 on the Qing Dynasty Chinese Embassy grounds. The first curriculum called for rote memorization of the four major Confucian texts (the Four Books and Five Classics) along with Western science and technology. This was followed suit in the establishment of other Chinese schools, such as Hua Siong College of Iloilo, established in Iloilo in 1912, the Chinese Patriotic School, established in Manila in 1912 (the first school for the Cantonese Chinese), Saint Stephen's High School, established in Manila in 1915 (the first sectarian school for the Chinese), and the Chinese National School, established in Cebu in 1915.

Burgeoning of Chinese schools throughout the Philippines, including in Manila, occurred from the 1920s until the 1970s, with a brief interlude during World War II, when all Chinese schools were ordered closed by the Japanese and their students were forcibly integrated into Japanese-sponsored Philippine public education. After World War II, the Third Republic of the Philippines and the Republic of China (ROC) signed the Sino-Philippine Treaty of Amity, which provided for the direct control of Chinese schools throughout the archipelago by the Republic of China (Taiwan)'s Ministry of Education. In the late 20th century, despite Mandarin taking the place of Amoy Hokkien as the usual Chinese course taught in Chinese schools, some schools still tried to teach Hokkien as well, deeming it more practical in the Philippine-Chinese setting.

Such a situation continued until 1973, when amendments made during the Marcos Era to the Philippine Constitution effectively transferred all Chinese schools to the authority of the Republic of the Philippines' Department of Education (DepEd). With this, the medium of instruction for teaching Standard Chinese (Mandarin) was shifted from Amoy Hokkien Chinese to Mandarin Chinese (or in some schools to English). Teaching hours relegated to Chinese language and arts, which featured prominently in the pre-1973 Chinese schools, were reduced. Lessons in Chinese geography and history, which were previously subjects in their own right, were incorporated into the Chinese language subject(s), whereas Filipino (Tagalog) and Philippine history, civics and culture became newly required subjects.

The changes in Chinese education initiated with the 1973 Philippine Constitution led to a large shifting of mother tongues, reflecting the assimilation of the Chinese Filipinos into general Philippine society. The older generation of Chinese Filipinos, who were educated in the old curriculum, typically use Philippine Hokkien at home, while most younger-generation Chinese Filipinos are more comfortable conversing in English, Filipino (Tagalog), and/or other Philippine languages like Cebuano, including their code-switching forms like Taglish and Bislish, which are sometimes varyingly admixed with Philippine Hokkien to make Hokaglish.

Curriculum

Chinese Filipino schools typically feature curriculum prescribed by the Philippine Department of Education (DepEd). The limited time spent in Chinese instruction consists largely of language arts.

The three core Chinese subjects are "Chinese Grammar", "Chinese Composition", and "Chinese Mathematics". Other schools may add other subjects such as "Chinese Calligraphy". Chinese history, geography and culture are also integrated in all the three core Chinese subjects – they stood as independent subjects of their own before 1973. Many schools currently teach at least just one Chinese subject, known simply as just "Chinese". It also varies per school if either or both Traditional Chinese with Zhuyin (known in many schools in Hokkien ) and/or Simplified Chinese with Pinyin is taught. Currently, all Chinese class subjects are taught in Mandarin Chinese (known in many schools in Hokkien ) and in some schools, students are prohibited from speaking any other language, such as English, Filipino (Tagalog), other regional Philippine languages, or even Hokkien during Chinese classes, when decades before, there were no such restrictions.

Schools and universities

Many Chinese Filipino schools are sectarian, being founded by either Roman Catholic or Chinese Protestant Christian missions. These include Grace Christian College (Protestant-Baptist), Hope Christian High School (Protestant-Evangelical), Immaculate Conception Academy (Roman Catholic-Missionary Sisters of the Immaculate Conception), Jubilee Christian Academy (Protestant-Evangelical), LIGHT Christian Academy (Protestant-Evangelical), Makati Hope Academy (Protestant-Evangelical), MGC-New Life Christian Academy (Protestant-Evangelical), Saint Peter the Apostle School (Roman Catholic-Archdiocese of Manila), Saint Jude Catholic School (Roman Catholic-Society of the Divine Word), Saint Stephen's High School (Protestant-Episcopalian), Ateneo de Iloilo, Ateneo de Cebu and Xavier School (Roman Catholic-Society of Jesus).

Major non-sectarian schools include Chiang Kai Shek College, Manila Patriotic School, Philippine Chen Kuang High School, Philippine Chung Hua School, Philippine Cultural College – the oldest Chinese Filipino secondary school in the Philippines, and Tiong Se Academy – the oldest Chinese Filipino school in the Philippines.

Chiang Kai Shek College is the only college in the Philippines accredited by both the Philippine Department of Education (DepEd) and the Republic of China (Taiwan) Ministry of Education.

Most Chinese Filipinos attend Chinese Filipino schools until Secondary level and then transfer to non-Chinese colleges and universities to complete their tertiary degree, due to the dearth of Chinese language tertiary institutions.

Name format

Many Chinese who lived during the Spanish naming edict of 1849 eventually adopted Spanish name formats, along with a Spanish given name (e.g., Florentino Cu y Chua). Some adopted their entire Chinese name romanized as a surname for the entire clan (e.g., Jose Antonio Chuidian; Alberto Cojuangco). Chinese mestizos, as well as some Chinese who chose to completely assimilate into the local Filipino or Spanish culture during Spanish colonial times also adopted Spanish surnames, just as any other Filipino, either as per christening of a new Christian name under Catholic Christian baptismal under the Spanish friars or through the 1849 decree of Gov-Gen. Narciso Claveria that distributed surnames from the Catálogo alfabético de apellidos, most of which listed there were Spanish surnames.

Newer Chinese migrants who came during the American Colonial Period use a combination of an adopted Spanish (or rarely, English) name together with their Chinese name (e.g., Carlos Palanca Tan Quin Lay or Vicente Go Tam Co). This trend was to continue up to the late 1970s.

As both exposure to North American media as well as the number of Chinese Filipinos educated in English increased, the use of English names among Chinese Filipinos, both common and unusual, started to increase as well. Popular names among the second generation Chinese community included English names ending in "-son" or other Chinese-sounding suffixes, such as Anderson, Emerson, Jackson, Jameson, Jasson, Patrickson, Washington, among such others. For parents who are already third and fourth generation Chinese Filipinos, English names reflecting American popular trends are given, such as Ethan, Austin and Aidan.

It is thus not unusual to find a young Chinese Filipino, for example, named "Chase Tan", whose father's name is "Emerson Tan" and whose grandfather's name is "Elpidio Tan Keng Kui", reflecting the depth of immersion into the English language as well as into the Philippine society as a whole.

Surnames

Chinese Filipinos whose ancestors came to the Philippines from 1898 onward usually have monosyllabic Chinese surnames. On the other hand, most Chinese ancestors came to the Philippines prior to 1898 usually have multisyllabic surnames such as Gokongwei, Ongpin, Pempengco, Yuchengco, Teehankee and Yaptinchay among such others. These were originally full Chinese names which were transliterated in Spanish orthography and adopted as surnames.

Common Chinese Filipino surnames are: Tan/Chan (陳/陈), Dy/Dee/Lee/Li (李), Sy/See/Siy/Sze (施), Lim/Lam (林), Chua/Choa/Choi (蔡), Yap/Ip (葉/叶), Co/Ko/Kho (許/许), Ko/Gao/Caw (高), Ho/Haw/Hau/Caw (侯), Cua/Kua/Co/Kho/Ko (柯), Coo/Khoo/Cu/Kuh (邱), Go/Ngo/Wu (吳/吴), Ong/Wong (王), Ang/Hong/Hung (洪), Lao (劉/刘), Tiu/Chang (張/张), Yu/Young/Yana (楊/杨), Auyong/Awyoung (歐陽/欧阳), Ng/Uy/Wee/Hong/Wong/Huang (黃), Tiu/Chiu/Chio/Chu (趙/赵), Chu/Chiu/Chow (周), King (龔), Chan (曾), Ty/Tee (鄭/郑), Ching/Cheng/Chong (莊/庄), Que/Cue/Kwok (郭), Leong/Liong/Leung (梁), etc.

On the other hand, most Chinese Filipinos whose ancestors came to the Philippines prior to 1898 use a Hispanicized surname (see below). Many Filipinos who have Hispanicized Chinese surnames are no longer pure Chinese, but are Chinese mestizos.

Hispanicized surnames

Chinese Filipinos and Chinese mestizos usually have multisyllabic surnames such as Angseeco (from ang/see/co/kho) Aliangan (from liang/gan), Angkeko, Apego (from ang/ke/co/go/kho), Chuacuco, Chuatoco, Chuateco, Ciacho (from Sia), Cinco (from Go), Cojuangco, Corong, Cuyegkeng, Dioquino, Dytoc, Dy-Cok, Dypiangco, Dysangco, Dytioco, Gueco, Gokongwei, Gundayao, Kimpo/Quimpo, King/Quing, Landicho, Lanting, Limcuando, Ongpin, Pempengco, Quebengco, Siopongco, Sycip, Tambengco, Tambunting, Tanbonliong, Tantoco, Tiolengco, Yuchengco, Tanciangco, Yuipco, Yupangco, Licauco, Limcaco, Ongpauco, Tancangco, Tanchanco, Teehankee, Uytengsu and Yaptinchay among such others. These were originally full Hokkien Chinese names which were transliterated in Latin letters with Spanish orthography and adopted as Hispanicized surnames.

There are also multisyllabic Chinese surnames that are Spanish transliterations of Hokkien words. Surnames like Tuazon (Eldest Grandchild, 大孫, Tuā-sun), Tiongson/Tiongzon (Eldest Grandchild, 長孫, Tióng-sun)/(Second/Middle Grandchild, 仲孫, Tiōng-sun), Sioson (Youngest Grandchild, 小孫, Sió-sun), Echon/Ichon/Itchon/Etchon/Ychon (First Grandchild, 一孫, It-sun), Dizon (Second Grandchild, 二孫, Dī-sun), Samson/Sanson (Third Grandchild, 三孫, Sam-sun), Sison (Fourth Grandchild, 四孫, Sì-sun), Gozon/Goson/Gozum (Fifth Grandchild, 五孫, Gǒ͘-sun), Lacson (Sixth Grandchild, 六孫, La̍k-sun), Sitchon/Sichon (Seventh Grandchild, 七孫, Tshit-sun), Pueson (Eighth Grandchild, 八孫, Pueh-sun), Causon/Cauzon (Ninth Grandchild, 九孫, Káu-sun), are examples of transliterations of designations that use the Hokkien suffix -son/-zon/-chon (Hokkien ) used as surnames for some Chinese Filipinos who trace their ancestry from Chinese immigrants to the Philippines during the Spanish Colonial Period. The surnames 孫, 仲孫, 長孫 are listed in the classic Chinese text Hundred Family Surnames, perhaps shedding light on the Hokkien suffix -son/-zon/-chon used here as a surname alongside some sort of accompanying enumeration scheme.

The Chinese who survived the massacre in Manila in the 1700s fled to other parts of the Philippines and to hide their identity, some also adopted two-syllable surnames ending in "son" or "zon" and "co" such as: Yanson = Yan = 燕孫, Ganzon = Gan = 颜孫(Hokkien), Guanzon = Guan/Kwan = 关孫 (Cantonese), Tiongson/Tiongzon = Tiong = 仲孫 (Hokkien), Cuayson/Cuayzon = 邱孫 (Hokkien), Yuson = Yu = 余孫, Tingson/Tingzon = Ting = 陈孫 (Hokchew), Siason = Sia = 谢孫 (Hokkien).

Many also took on Spanish or native Filipino surnames (e.g. Alonzo, Alcaraz, Bautista, De la Cruz, De la Rosa, De los Santos, Garcia, Gatchalian, Mercado, Palanca, Robredo, Sanchez, Tagle, Torres, etc.) upon naturalization. Today, it can be difficult to identify who are Chinese Filipino based on surnames alone.

A phenomenon common among Chinese migrants in the Philippines dating from the 1900s would be to purchase their surname, particularly during the American Colonial Period, when the Chinese Exclusion Act was applied to the Philippines. Such law led new Chinese migrants to purchase the Hispanic or native surnames of native and mestizo Filipinos and thus pass off as long-time Filipino residents of Chinese descent or as native or mestizo Filipinos. Many also purchased the Alien Landing Certificates of other Chinese who have gone back to China and assumed his surname and/or identity. Sometimes, younger Chinese migrants would circumvent the Act through adoption – wherein a Chinese with Philippine nationality adopts a relative or a stranger as his own children, thereby giving the adoptee automatic Filipino citizenship – and a new surname.

Food

Traditional Tsinoy cuisine, as Chinese Filipino home-based dishes are locally known, make use of recipes that are traditionally found in China's Fujian Province and fuse them with locally available ingredients and recipes. These include unique foods such as hokkien chha-peng (Fujianese-style fried rice), si-nit mi-soa (birthday noodles), pansit canton (Fujianese-style e-fu noodles), hong ma or humba (braised pork belly), sibut (four-herb chicken soup), hototay (Fujianese egg drop soup), kiampeng (Fujianese beef fried rice), machang (glutinous rice with adobo) and taho (a dessert made of soft tofu, arnibal syrup and pearl sago).

However, most Chinese restaurants in the Philippines, as in other places, feature Cantonese, Shanghainese and Northern Chinese cuisines, rather than traditional Fujianese fare.

Politics
With the increasing number of Chinese with Philippine nationality, the number of political candidates of Chinese-Filipino descent also started to increase. The most significant change within Chinese Filipino political life would be the citizenship decree promulgated by former President Ferdinand Marcos which opened the gates for thousands of Chinese Filipinos to formally adopt Philippine citizenship.

Chinese Filipino political participation largely began with the People Power Revolution of 1986 which toppled the Marcos dictatorship and ushered in the Aquino presidency. The Chinese have been known to vote in blocs in favor of political candidates who are favorable to the Chinese community.

Important Philippine political leaders with Chinese ancestry include the current president Bongbong Marcos, and former presidents Rodrigo Duterte, Emilio Aguinaldo, Benigno Aquino III, Cory Aquino, Sergio Osmeña, Manuel Quezon and Ferdinand Marcos, former senators Nikki Coseteng, Alfredo Lim, Raul Roco, Panfilo Lacson, Vicente Yap Sotto, Vicente Sotto III and Roseller Lim, as well as several governors, congressmen and mayors throughout the Philippines. Many ambassadors and recent appointees to the presidential cabinet are also Chinese Filipinos like Arthur Yap, Jesse Robredo, Jose Yulo, Manuel Yan, Alberto Lim, Danilo Lim, Karl Chua and Bong Go.

The late Cardinal Jaime Sin, the late Cardinal Rufino Santos and Cardinal Luis Antonio Tagle also have Chinese ancestry.

Society and culture

Society

The Chinese Filipino are mostly business owners and their life centers mostly in the family business. These mostly small or medium enterprises play a significant role in the Philippine economy. A handful of these entrepreneurs run large companies and are respected as some of the most prominent business tycoons in the Philippines.

Chinese Filipinos attribute their success in business to frugality and hard work, Confucian values and their traditional Chinese customs and traditions. They are very business-minded and entrepreneurship is highly valued and encouraged among the young. Most Chinese Filipinos are urban dwellers. An estimated 50% of the Chinese Filipino live within Metro Manila, with the rest in the other major cities of the Philippines. In contrast with the Chinese mestizos, few Chinese are plantation owners. This is partly due to the fact that until recently when the Chinese Filipino became Filipino citizens, the law prohibited the non-citizens, which most Chinese were, from owning land.

Culture

As with other Southeast Asian nations, the Chinese community in the Philippines has become a repository of traditional Chinese culture common to unassimilated ethnic minorities throughout the world. Whereas in mainland China many cultural traditions and customs were suppressed or destroyed during the Cultural Revolution or simply regarded as old-fashioned nowadays, these traditions have remained largely preserved in the Philippines.

Many new cultural twists have evolved within the Chinese community in the Philippines, distinguishing it from other overseas Chinese communities in Southeast Asia. These cultural variations are highly evident during festivals such as Chinese New Year and Mid-Autumn Festival. The Chinese Filipino have developed unique customs pertaining to weddings, birthdays and funerary rituals.

Weddings
Wedding traditions of Chinese Filipinos, regardless of religious persuasion, usually involve identification of the dates of supplication or pamamanhikan (kiu-hun), engagement (ting-hun) and wedding (kan-chhiu) adopted from Filipino customs. In addition, feng shui based on the birthdates of the couple, as well as of their parents and grandparents may also be considered. Certain customs found among Chinese Filipinos include during supplication (kiu-hun) also include a solemn tea ceremony within the house of the bridegroom ensues where the couple will be served tea, egg noodles (misua) and given red packets or envelopes containing money, commonly referred to as an ang-pao. 

During the supplication ceremony, pregnant women and recently engaged couples are forbidden from attending the ceremony. Engagement (ting-hun) quickly follows, where the bride enters the ceremonial room walking backward and turned three times before being allowed to see the groom. A welcome drink consisting of red-colored juice is given to the couple, quickly followed by the exchange of gifts for both families and the wedding tea ceremony, where the bride serves the groom's family and vice versa. The engagement reception consists of sweet tea soup and misua, both of which symbolizes long-lasting relationship.

Before the wedding, the groom is expected to provide the matrimonial bed in the future couple's new home. A baby born under the Chinese sign of the Dragon may be placed in the bed to ensure fertility. He is also tasked to deliver the wedding gown to his bride on the day prior to the wedding to the sister of the bride, as it is considered ill fortune for the groom to see the bride on that day. For the bride, she prepares an initial batch of personal belongings (ke-chheng) to the new home, all wrapped and labeled with the Chinese characters for sang-hi. On the wedding date, the bride wears a red robe emblazoned with the emblem of a dragon prior to wearing the bridal gown, to which a pair of sang-hi (English: marital happiness) coin is sewn. Before leaving her home, the bride then throws a fan bearing the Chinese characters for sang-hi toward her mother to preserve harmony within the bride's family upon her departure. Most of the wedding ceremony then follows Catholic or Protestant traditions. 

Post-wedding rituals include the two single brothers or relatives of the bride giving the couple a wa-hoe set, which is a bouquet of flowers with umbrella and sewing kit, for which the bride gives an ang-pao in return. After three days, the couple then visits the bride's family, upon which a pair of sugar cane branch is given, which is a symbol of good luck and vitality among Hokkien people.

Births and birthdays
Birthday traditions of Chinese Filipinos involve large banquet receptions, always featuring noodles and round-shaped desserts. All the relatives of the birthday celebrant are expected to wear red clothing which symbolize respect for the celebrant. Wearing clothes with a darker hue is forbidden and considered bad luck. During the reception, relatives offer ang paos (red packets containing money) to the birthday celebrant, especially if he is still unmarried. For older celebrants, boxes of egg noodles (misua) and eggs on which red paper is placed are given.

Births of babies are not celebrated and they are usually given pet names, which he keeps until he reaches first year of age. The Philippine custom of circumcision is widely practiced within the Chinese Filipino community regardless of religion, albeit at a lesser rate as compared to native Filipinos. First birthdays are celebrated with much pomp and pageantry, and grand receptions are hosted by the child's paternal grandparents.

Funerals and burials
Funerary traditions of Chinese Filipinos mirror those found in Southern Fujian. A unique tradition of many Chinese Filipino families is the hiring of professional mourners which is alleged to hasten the ascent of a dead relative's soul into Heaven. This belief particularly mirrors the merger of traditional Chinese beliefs with the Catholic religion.

Subcultures
Most of the Chinese mestizos, especially the landed gentry trace their ancestry to the Spanish era. They are the "First Chinese" or Sangley whose descendants nowadays are mostly integrated into Philippine society. Most are from Zhangzhou, Fujian province in China, with a minority coming from Guangdong. They have embraced a Hispanized Filipino culture since the 17th century. After the end of Spanish rule, their descendants, the Chinese mestizos, managed to invent a cosmopolitan mestizo culture coupled with an extravagant Mestizo de Sangley lifestyle, intermarrying either with native Filipinos or with Spanish mestizos.

The largest group of Chinese in the Philippines are the "Second Chinese," who are descendants of migrants in the first half of the 20th century, between the anti-Qing 1911 Revolution in China and the Chinese Civil War. This group accounts for most of the "full-blooded" Chinese. They are almost entirely from Fujian Province.

The "Third Chinese" are the second largest group of Chinese, the recent immigrants from Mainland China, after the Chinese economic reform of the 1980s. Generally, the "Third Chinese" are the most entrepreneurial and have not totally lost their Chinese identity in its purest form and seen by some "Second Chinese" as a business threat. Meanwhile, continuing immigration from Mainland China further enlarge this group

Civic organizations

Aside from their family businesses, Chinese Filipinos are active in Chinese-oriented civic organizations related to education, health care, public safety, social welfare and public charity. As most Chinese Filipinos are reluctant to participate in politics and government, they have instead turned to civic organizations as their primary means of contributing to the general welfare of the Chinese community. Beyond the traditional family and clan associations, Chinese Filipinos tend to be active members of numerous alumni associations holding annual reunions for the benefit of their Chinese-Filipino secondary schools.
Outside of secondary schools catering to Chinese Filipinos, some Chinese Filipinos businessmen have established charitable foundations that aim to help others and at the same time minimize tax liabilities. Notable ones include the Gokongwei Brothers Foundation, Metrobank Foundation, Tan Yan Kee Foundation, Angelo King Foundation, Jollibee Foundation, Alfonso Yuchengco Foundation, Cityland Foundation, etc. Some Chinese-Filipino benefactors have also contributed to the creation of several centers of scholarship in prestigious Philippine Universities, including the John Gokongwei School of Management at Ateneo de Manila, the Yuchengco Center at De La Salle University, and the Ricardo Leong Center of Chinese Studies at Ateneo de Manila. Coincidentally, both Ateneo and La Salle enroll a large number of Chinese-Filipino students. In health care, Chinese Filipinos were instrumental in establishing and building medical centers that cater for the Chinese community such as the Chinese General Hospital and Medical Center, the Metropolitan Medical Center, Chong Hua Hospital and the St. Luke's Medical Center, Inc., one of Asia's leading health care institutions. In public safety, Teresita Ang See's Kaisa, a Chinese-Filipino civil rights group, organized the Citizens Action Against Crime and the Movement for the Restoration of Peace and Order at the height of a wave of anti-Chinese kidnapping incidents in the early 1990s. In addition to fighting crime against Chinese, Chinese Filipinos have organized volunteer fire brigades all over the country, reportedly the best in the nation. that cater to the Chinese community. In the arts and culture, the Bahay Tsinoy and the Yuchengco Museum were established by Chinese Filipinos to showcase the arts, culture and history of the Chinese.

Ethnic Chinese Filipinos' perceptions of non-Chinese Filipinos

Non-Chinese Filipinos were initially referred to as huan-á (番仔) by ethnic Chinese Filipinos in the Philippines. It is also used in other Southeast Asian countries such as Malaysia, Singapore and Indonesia by Hokkien-speaking ethnic Chinese to refer to peoples of Malay ancestry. In Taiwan, it was also used but it has become a taboo term with negative stigma since it was used to refer to indigenous Taiwanese aboriginals and the Japanese during the Japanese occupation of Taiwan. The term itself in mainland China originally just meant "foreigner" but at times may also have been considered derogatory since it could negatively connote to "barbarian/outsider" by some who had negative views on certain neighboring non-Chinese peoples that certain groups historically lived with since for centuries this was the term predominantly used to refer to non-Chinese people, but today, it does not necessarily carry its original connotations, depending on the speaker's perceptions and culture of how they grew up to learn to perceive the term, since in the Philippines, its present usage now mostly just plainly refers to any non-Chinese Filipinos, especially native Filipinos. When speaking Hokkien, most older Chinese Filipinos still use the term, while younger Chinese Filipinos may sometimes instead use the term Hui-li̍p-pin lâng (菲律賓儂), which directly means, "Philippine person" or simply "Filipino". This itself brings complications though as Chinese Filipinos themselves are Filipinos too, born and raised in the Philippines often with families of multiple generations carrying Filipino citizenship.

Some Chinese Filipinos perceive the government and authorities to be unsympathetic to the plight of the ethnic Chinese, especially in terms of frequent kidnapping for ransom during the late 1990s. Currently, most of the third or fourth generation Chinese Filipinos generally view the non-Chinese Filipino people and government positively, and have largely forgotten about the historical oppression of the ethnic Chinese. They are also most likely to consider themselves as just being "Filipino" and focus on the Philippines, rather than on just being "Chinese" and being associated with China (PRC) or Taiwan (ROC).

Some Chinese Filipinos believe racism still exists toward their community among a minority of non-Chinese Filipinos, who the Chinese Filipinos refer to as "pâi-huâ" (排華) in Philippine Hokkien. Organizations belonging to this category include the Laspip Movement, headed by Adolfo Abadeza, as well as the Kadugong Liping Pilipino, founded by Armando "Jun" Ducat Jr. that stirred tensions around the late 1990s. Also due in part to racial or chauvinistic views from Mainland Chinese towards native Filipinos or Filipinos in general in the 1980's after Filipinos became in demand in the international work force, some racial tendencies of Mainland Chinese brought about by Han chauvinism against native Filipinos have intensified in the 21st century, where many Mainland Chinese from mainland China have branded the Philippines as a "gullible nation of maids and banana sellers", amidst disputes in the South China Sea. Due to such racist remarks against native Filipinos, racism against Mainland Chinese in mainland China and by extension, ethnic-Chinese in general such as Chinese Filipinos, later developed among certain native or mestizo Filipino communities as a form of backlash. During the COVID-19 pandemic in 2020, some Chinese Filipinos have also voiced concerns about Sinophobic sentiments that some non-Chinese Filipinos may carry against any ethnic Chinese, especially those from mainland China due to being the site of the first coronavirus outbreak, that may sometimes extend and generalize on Chinese Filipinos. Chinese Filipino organizations have discouraged the mainstream Filipino public from being discriminatory, particularly against Chinese nationals amid the global spread of COVID-19.

Intermarriage
Chinese mestizos are persons of mixed Chinese and either Spanish or indigenous Filipino ancestry. They are thought to make up as much as 25% of the country's total population. A number of Chinese mestizos have surnames that reflect their heritage, mostly two or three syllables that have Chinese roots (e.g., the full name of a Chinese ancestor) with a Hispanized phonetic spelling.

During the Spanish colonial period, the Spanish authorities encouraged the Chinese male immigrants to convert to Catholicism. Those who converted got baptized and their names Hispanized, and were allowed to intermarry with indigenous women. They and their mestizo offspring became colonial subjects of the Spanish crown, and as such were granted several privileges and afforded numerous opportunities denied to the unconverted, non-citizen Chinese. Starting as traders, they branched out into land leasing, moneylending and later, landholding.

Chinese mestizo men and women were encouraged to marry Spanish and indigenous women and men, by means of dowries, in a policy to mix the races of the Philippines so it would be impossible to expel the Spanish.

In these days however, blood purity is still of prime concern in most traditional Chinese Filipino families especially pure-blooded ones. Many Chinese Filipinos believe that a Chinese Filipino must only be married to a fellow Chinese Filipino since the marriage to a non-Chinese Filipino or any outsider was considered taboo.

Chinese marriage to native or mestizo Filipinos and outsiders posts uncertainty on both parties. The Chinese Filipino family structure is patriarchal hence, it is the male that carries the last name of the family which also carries the legacy of the family itself. Male Chinese Filipino marriage to a native or mestiza Filipina or any outsider is more admissible than vice versa. In the case of the Chinese Filipina female marrying a native or mestizo Filipino or any outsider, it may cause several unwanted issues especially on the side of the Chinese family.

In some instances, a member of a traditional Chinese Filipino family may be denied of his or her inheritance and likely to be disowned by his or her family by marrying an outsider without their consent. However, there are exceptions in which intermarriage to a non-Chinese Filipino or any outsider is permissible provided their family is well-off and/or influential.

On the other hand, modern Chinese Filipino families allow their children to marry native or mestizo Filipino or any outsider. However, many of them would still prefer that the Filipino or any outsider would have some or little Chinese blood, such as descendants of Chinese mestizos during Spanish colonial period.

Trade and industry

Like much of Southeast Asia, Filipinos of Chinese ancestry dominate the Philippine economy and commerce at every level of society. Chinese Filipinos wield tremendous economic clout unerringly disproportionate to their small population size over their indigenous Filipino majority counterparts and play a critical role in maintaining the country's economic vitality and prosperity. With their powerful economic prominence, the Chinese virtually make up the country's entire wealthy elite. Chinese Filipinos, in the aggregate, represent a disproportionate wealthy, market-dominant minority not only form a distinct ethnic community, they also form, by and large, an economic class: the commercial middle and upper class in contrast to the poorer indigenous Filipino majority working and underclass. Entire posh Chinese enclaves have sprung up in major Filipino cities across the country, literally walled off from the poorer indigenous Filipino masses guarded by heavily armed, private security forces. The Chinese Filipino community is economically influential owing to their business and investment prosperity, acculturation into mainstream Filipino society, and maintaining their sense of community, social, and ethnic cohesion and distinction through clan associations.

The Chinese have been major players in the Filipino business sector and dominated the economy of the Philippines for centuries long before the pre-Spanish and American colonial eras. Long before the Spanish conquest of the Philippines, Chinese merchants carried on trading activities with native communities along the coast of modern Mainland China. By the time the Spanish arrived, the Chinese controlled all the trading and commercial activities across the Philippines, serving as retailers, artisans, and food providers for various Spanish settlements. During the American colonial epoch, Chinese merchants controlled a significant percentage of the retail trade and internal commerce of the country. They predominated the retail trade and owned three-quarters of the 2500 rice mills interspersed along with the Filipino islands. Total resources of banking capital held by the Chinese was $27 million in 1937 to a high of $100 million in the estimated aggregate, making them second to the Americans in terms of total foreign capital investment held. Under Spanish rule, the Chinese were willing to engage in trade and venture into other business activities. Filipino entrepreneurs of Chinese ancestry were responsible for introducing sugar refining devices, new construction techniques, moveable type printing, and bronze making. The Chinese also provided fishing, gardening, artisan, and other such trading services. Many poverty-stricken Filipinos of Chinese ancestry were attracted to business as they were prohibited from owning land and saw the only path out of abject poverty was by going into commercial business and entrepreneurship, through taking charge of their own financial destinies by becoming self-employed as dealers, marketers, vendors, retailers, traders, collectors, hawkers, peddlers, and distributors of variegated goods and services to the Spanish and American colonizers as well as the Filipino populace. Mainly attracted and appealed by the promise of economic opportunity during the first four decades of the 20th century, American colonization of the Philippines allowed the Chinese to secure their economic clout among their entrepreneurial and investment pursuits. The implementation of a free trade policy between the Philippines and the United States allowed the Chinese to capitalize on a burgeoning Filipino consumer market. As a result, Filipino entrepreneurs and investors of Chinese ancestry were able to capture a significant market share by expanding their business activities in which they were the major players and ventured into then newly flourishing industries such as industrial manufacturing and financial services.

Filipinos of Chinese ancestry are estimated to control 60 to 70 percent of the Philippine economy. The Chinese Filipino community, amounting to 1 percent of the overall population of the Philippines, control the nation's largest and most lucrative department store chains, supermarkets, hotels, shopping malls, airlines, and fast-food outlets in addition to all the major financial services institutions, banks and stock brokerage firms, as well as dominating the nation's wholesale distribution networks, shipping, banking, construction, textiles, real estate, personal computer, semiconductors, pharmaceutical, mass media, and industrial manufacturing industries. Filipinos of Chinese ancestry are also involved in the processing and distribution of pharmaceutical products. More than 1000 firms are involved in this industry, with most being small and medium-sized companies amounting to an aggregate capitalization of 1.2 billion pesos. Filipinos of Chinese ancestry are prominent players in the Philippines mass media industry, as they also control six out of the ten English-language newspapers in Manila, including the one with the largest daily circulation. Many retail stores and restaurants around the Philippines are owned by Filipinos of Chinese ancestry, who are regularly featured in Manila newspapers, often attracted great public interest as they were used to illustrate the community's strong economic influence. The Chinese also dominate the Filipino telecommunications industry, where one of the current significant players in the Filipino telecom sector was the business taipan John Gokongwei, whose conglomerate JG Summit Holdings controlled 28 wholly-owned subsidiaries with interests ranging from food and agro-industrial products, hotels, insurance agencies, financial services, electronic components, textiles and garments, real estate, petrochemicals, power generation, printing, newspaper publishing, packaging materials, detergents, and cement mixing. Gokongwei began his business career by starting out in food processing during the 1950s, venturing into textile manufacturing in the early 1970s, and then cornered the Filipino real estate development and hotel management industries by the end of the decade. In 1976, Gokongwei established Manila Midtown Hotels and has since then assumed the control of two other hotel chains, Cebu Midtown and Manila Galleria Suites respectively. In addition, Gokongwei has also made forays into the Filipino financial services sector as he expanded his business interests by investing in two Filipino banks, PCI Bank and Far East Bank, in addition to negotiating the acquisition of one of the Philippines's oldest newspapers, The Manila Times. Gokongwei's eldest daughter became publisher of the newspaper in December 1988 at the age of 28, at which during the same time her father acquired the paper from the Roceses, a Spanish Mestizo family. Of the 66 percent remaining part of the economy in the Philippines held by either ethnic Chinese or indigenous Filipinos, Chinese Filipinos control 35 percent of all total sales. Filipinos of Chinese ancestry control an estimated 50 to 60 percent of non-land share capital in the Philippines, and as much as 35 percent of total sales are attributed to the largest public and private firms owned by the Chinese. Many prominent Filipino companies that are Chinese-owned focus on diverse industry sectors such as semiconductors, chemicals, real estate, engineering, construction, fibre-optics, textiles, financial services, consumer electronics, food, and personal computers. A third of the top 500 companies publicly listed on the Philippines stock exchange are owned by Filipinos of Chinese ancestry. Of the top 1000 firms, Filipinos of Chinese ancestry control 36 percent of them and among the top 100 companies, 43 percent. Between 1978 and 1988, 146 of the country's 494 top companies were under Chinese hands. Filipinos of Chinese ancestry are also estimated to control over one-third of the Philippines 1000 largest corporations with the Chinese controlling 47 of the 68 locally owned public companies. Filipino entrepreneurs of Chinese ancestry are also responsible for generating 55 percent of overall Filipino private business across the country. In addition, Chinese-owned companies account for 66 percent of the sixty largest commercial entities in the Philippines. In 2015, the top 4 wealthiest people in the Philippines (in addition to 10 out of the top 15) were of Chinese ancestry.

As Chinese Filipino entrepreneurs became more financially prosperous, they often coalesced their financial resources and pooled large amounts of seed capital together to forge joint business ventures with expatriate Mainland and Overseas Chinese businessmen and investors from all over the world. Like other Southeast Asian businesses owned by those of Chinese ancestry, Chinese-owned businesses in the Philippines often link up with Greater Chinese and other Overseas Chinese businesses and networks across the globe to focus on new business opportunities to collaborate and concentrate on. Common industry sectors of focus include real estate development, engineering, textiles, consumer electronics, financial services, food, semiconductors, and chemicals. Besides sharing a common ancestry, cultural, linguistic, and familial ties, many Filipino entrepreneurs and investors of Chinese ancestry are particular strong adherents of the Confucian paradigm of interpersonal relationships when doing business with each other, as the Chinese believed that the underlying source for entrepreneurial and investment success relied on the cultivation of personal relationships. Moreover, Filipino businesses that are Chinese-owned form a part of the larger bamboo network, a business network of Overseas Chinese firms operating in the markets of Greater China and Southeast Asia that share common family, ethnic, linguistic, and cultural ties. With the spectacular growth of varying success stories witnessed by a number of individual Chinese Filipino business tycoons and investors have allowed them to expand their traditional corporate activities beyond the Philippines to forge international partnerships with increasing numbers of expatriate Mainland Chinese and Overseas Chinese investors on a global scale. Instead of quixotically diverting excess profits elsewhere, many Filipino entrepreneurs of Chinese ancestry are known for their penurious and parsimonious ways by eschewing improvident extravagance and conspicuous consumption but instead adhere to the Chinese paradigm of being frugal by reinvesting a substantial surplus of their business profits for the purpose of corporate expansion. A sizable percentage of the conglomerate firms managed by capable Filipino entrepreneurs and investors of Chinese ancestry with the necessary entrepreneurial acumen and visionary foresight were able to germinate from small budding enterprises to making headway into gargantuan corporate leviathans garnering widespread economic influence across the Philippines, Southeast Asia, and the global financial markets. Such massive corporate expansions engendered the term "Chinoy", which is colloquially used in Filipino newspapers to denote individuals with a degree of Chinese ancestry who either speak a Chinese dialect or adhere to Chinese customs.

In 1940, Filipinos of Chinese ancestry were estimated to control 70 percent of the country's entire retail trade and 75 percent of the nation's rice mills. By 1948, the economic standing of the Chinese community began to elevate even further wielding considerable influence as the Chinese community exercised a considerable percentage of the total commercial investment, including 55 percent of the retail trade and 85 percent of the lumber sector. After the end of the Second Sino-Japanese war, Chinese Filipinos controlled 85 percent of the nation's retail trade. The Chinese also had controlled 40 percent of the retailing imports with substantial controlling interests in banking, oil refining, sugar milling, cement, tobacco, flour milling, glass, dairying, automobile manufacturing, and consumer electronics. Although the Filipino Hacienderos owned extensive businesses, Filipinos of Chinese ancestry augmented their economic power coinciding with the pro-market reforms of the late 1980s and 1990s by the Marcos administration. The Chinese increased their role in the domestic commercial sector acting as an intermediary of connecting producers with the consumer in the exchange of goods. The Chinese Filipino business community achieved such feats as a tight-knit group in an enclosed system by setting up their own distribution networks, locating major players, geographical coverage, attributes and characteristics, business strategies, staff recruitment, store proliferation, and establishing independent trade organizations. Filipino retail outlets that were Chinese-owned also exercise a disproportionate share of several local goods such as rice, lumber products, and alcoholic drinks. Some Chinese Filipino merchant traders even branched into retailing these products into rice milling, logging, saw-milling, distillery, tobacco, coconut oil processing, footwear making, and agricultural processing. The domestic Filipino economy began to broaden by the expansion of business activities long held by the Chinese also ushered in new forms of entrepreneurship by directing their corporate energies and capital into fostering new industries and growth areas.

Today, Filipinos of Chinese ancestry control all of the Philippines' largest and most lucrative department store chains, major supermarkets, and fast-food restaurants. In the fast-food industry, Filipino restaurateurs of Chinese ancestry have been behind the Philippines biggest fast-food franchise undertakings. A wave of big-name restaurant chains such as Chowking, Greenwich Pizza, Mang Inasal, Red Ribbon and the Mainland China-based Yonghe Dawang (永和大王) have made headway into the Filipino restaurant industry and germinated across the Philippines. There are roughly 3000 fast-food outlets and restaurants controlled by Filipino restaurateurs of Chinese ancestry, especially establishments specializing in Chinese cuisine have attracted an influx of foreign capital investments from Hong Kong and Taiwan. The banker and business taipan George Ty was responsible for securing and franchising the rights of the publicly traded American hamburger franchise McDonald's across the Philippines and the Jollibee fast-food chain, as the founder himself was a Filipino entrepreneur of Chinese ancestry. Jollibee's popularity has since then led to the expansion of its corporate operations by establishing subsidiaries in the Middle East, Hong Kong, Guam, and other Southeast Asian countries such as Brunei and Indonesia. In the beverage sector, San Miguel Corporation is the among the Philippines most prominent beverage operators, founded in 1851 by Enrique María Barretto de Ycaza y Esteban, the company supplies the country's entire beverage needs. Two Chinese Filipino-owned beverage companies, namely Lucio Tan's Asia Brewery and John Gokongwei's Universal Robina, along with a couple of lesser-known beverage providers are now competing with each other to capture the largest share in the Filipino food and beverage market.

Since the 1950s, Filipino entrepreneurs of Chinese ancestry have controlled the entirety of the Philippines' retail sector. Every small, medium, and large enterprise in the Filipino retail industry is under Chinese hands as the Chinese have been at the forefront at pioneering the modern and contemporary development of the Philippines's retail sector. From the 1970s, Filipino entrepreneurs of Chinese ancestry have re-established themselves as the dominant players in the Filipino retail industry with the corporate feat of presiding an estimated 8500 Chinese-owned retail and wholesale outlets around the country. On a microscopic scale, the Chinese Hokkien community have a proclivity to run capital intensive businesses such as banks, commercial shipping lines, rice mills, dry goods, and general stores while the Cantonese gravitated towards the hotels, restaurants, and laundromats. Filipino entrepreneurs of Chinese ancestry control two-thirds of the sales among the country's 67 largest commercial retail outlets. By the 1980s. Filipino entrepreneurs of Chinese ancestry began to expand their business activities in large-scale retailing and Filipino retailers that were Chinese-owned emerged as one of the largest department store owners in the Philippines with one prominent example being Rustan's, which is one of the most prestigious department store brands in the Philippines. Other prime retail outlets such as Shoe Mart owned by Henry Sy and John Gokongwei's Robinson's percolated rapidly, eventually finding their way into shopping malls situated across various parts of Metro-Manila. Another prominent retailer was the Chinese Filipino taipan, Lucio Tan. Tan started his business career in the cigarette distribution industry and then catapulted himself into entrepreneurial prominence within the major leagues of Filipino business circles after venturing into banking in 1977. Tan, whose flagship company Fortune Tobacco (now a Philippine affiliate of Philip Morris International) controls the largest market share of cigarette distribution in the country and has since then emerged as of one richest men in the Philippines. Aside from cornering Filipino tobacco distribution networks, Tan has since parlayed his business interests into a corporate conglomerate behemoth of his own LT Group Inc., with an empire presiding diversified business interests in chemicals, sports, education, brewing, financial services, real estate investing and property development, hotels (Century Park Hotel), in addition to acquiring a majority controlling interest in PAL, one of the largest airlines in the Philippines. In terms of industry distribution, small and medium size Chinese-owned retail outlets account for half of the Philippines retail trade sector, with 49.45 percent of the retail sector alone being controlled by Henry Sy's Shoemart, and the remaining share of the retail sector dominated by a few larger Chinese-owned retail outlets that include thousands of smaller retail subsidiaries. Sy built his business empire from scratch out of his Shoe Mart department store chain, and has since made forays into banking after assuming as a controlling shareholder of Banco de Oro, a commercial bank as well as owning a substantial interest in China Banking Corporation, a privately-owned commercial bank and wealth management house that offers seed capital that caters to the startup needs of up-and-coming Chinese Filipino entrepreneurs.

In terms of industry distribution, Chinese-owned manufacturing establishments account for a third of the Filipino industrial manufacturing sector. In the secondary industry, 75 percent of the country's 2500 rice mills were Chinese-owned. Chinese Filipino entrepreneurs were also dominant in wood processing, and accounted for over 10 percent of the capital invested in the lumber industry and controlled 85 percent of it as well as accounting for 40 percent of the industry's annual output and controlled nearly all the sawmills in the nation. Emerging import-substituting light industries would see the rise of active participation of Chinese entrepreneurs and owned several-salt works and a large number of small and medium-sized factories engaged in food processing as well as the production of leather and tobacco goods. The Chinese also dominate food processing with approximately 200 firms in this industry and exporting their finished products to Hong Kong, Singapore, and Taiwan. More than 200 companies are also involved in the production of paper, paper products, fertilizers, cosmetics, rubber products, and plastics. By the early 1960s, Chinese presence in the manufacturing sector became significant. Of the businesses that employed 10 or more workers, 35 percent were Chinese-owned and among 284 enterprises employing more than 100 workers, 37 percent were likewise Chinese-owned. Of the 163 domestic companies, 80 were Chinese-owned and included the manufacturing of coconut oil, food products, tobacco, textiles, plastic products, footwear, glass, and certain types of metals such as tubes and pipes, wire rods, nails, bolts, and containers while the native or mestizo Filipinos dominated sugar, rolling mills, industrial chemicals, fertilizers, cement, galvanizing plants, and tin plates. In 1965, Chinese Filipinos controlled 32 percent of the top industrial manufacturing firms. Of the 259 manufacturing corporations belonging to the top 1000 in the country, Chinese owned 33.6% of the top manufacturing companies as well as 43.2% of the top commercial manufacturing firms in 1980. By 1986, Chinese Filipino entrepreneurs controlled 45 percent of the nations top 120 domestic manufacturing companies. These companies are mainly involved in tobacco and cigarettes, soap and cosmetics, textiles and rubber footwear. The majority of Filipino industrial manufacturing companies that produce the processing of coconut products, flour, food products, textiles, plastic products, footwear, glass, as well as heavy industry products such as metals, steel, industrial chemicals, paper products, paints, leather, garments, sugar refining, timber processing, construction materials, food and beverages, rubber, plastics, semiconductors, and personal computers are controlled by Filipino entrepreneurs of Chinese ancestry.

From small trade cooperatives clustered by hometown pawnbrokers, Filipinos of Chinese ancestry would go on to establish and incorporate the largest financial services institutions in the Philippines. Filipinos of Chinese ancestry have dominated the Philippine financial services sector and have had a presence in the country's banking industry since the early part of the 20th century. The two earliest banks started were China Bank and the Mercantile Bank of China, established in 1920 and 1924 respectively. Today, the overwhelming majority of the Philippines' principal banks are now owned by Filipinos of Chinese ancestry, including Philippine Savings Bank, the Philippine National Bank which is owned by taipan, Lucio Tan, controlled through his conglomerate LT Group, Inc., and most notably Metrobank Group which was owned by banker and businessman George Ty, which is the country's second-largest and most aggressive financial services conglomerate. Lesser-known private commercial banks established in the 1950s and 1960s are also owned and controlled by Filipinos of Chinese ancestry. The lone exception of a non-Chinese owned Filipino bank was the Spanish Filipino Lopez-owned Philippine Commercial International Bank, which has since been taken over by Henry Sy's holding and investment company SM Investments Corporation during the mid-2000s, and reemerged itself as a subsidiary of Banco de Oro in 2007. By 1970, among the Philippine's five largest banks holding almost 50 percent of all assets in the banking industry, namely China Banking Corporation, Citibank, the Bank of the Philippine Islands, Equitable PCI Bank, in addition to the formerly government-owned Philippine National Bank were under the control of Chinese shareholders. By 1995, banks owned by Filipinos of Chinese ancestry had captured an even greater share of the Philippine's financial services sector after the formerly government-owned Philippine National Bank was partially privatized as four of the top five banks that were substantially controlled by Chinese shareholders claimed 48 percent of all bank assets and over 60 percent of all those held by private domestic commercial banks. By the mid-1990s, Filipinos of Chinese ancestry controlled 40 percent of the national corporate equity. In terms of industry distribution, Chinese-owned companies account for a quarter of the financial services sector. Today, the overwhelming majority of the Philippines's nine principal banks in addition to the formerly state-owned Philippine National Bank are now under the ownership of Chinese shareholders, such as the Allied Banking Corporation, Banco de Oro Group, China Banking Corporation (Chinabank), East West Banking Corporation, Metrobank group, Philippine Trust Company (Philtrust Bank), Rizal Commercial Banking group, Security Bank Corporation (Security Bank) and the United Coconut Planters Bank. Most of these banks comprise a larger part of an umbrella owned family conglomerate with assets exceeding $100 billion pesos. The total combined assets of all the Philippine's commercial banks under Chinese ownership account for 25.72 percent of all the total assets in the entire Filipino commercial banking system. Among the Philippines's 35 banks, shareholders of Chinese ancestry on average control 35 percent of total banking equity. There are also 23 Filipino insurance agencies that are Chinese-owned, with some branches overseas and in Hong Kong.

Of the 500 real estate companies operating in the Philippines, 120 are owned by Filipinos of Chinese ancestry with the firms mostly specializing in real estate investment, land, and property development, and construction and are mainly concentrated in Metropolitan Manila. Filipinos of Chinese ancestry have cornered the Philippine real estate investment markets, land, and property sectors which for a long time had been controlled by Spanish Filipinos. Initially, the Chinese were not allowed to own land until acquiring Filipino citizenship in the 1970s. Presently, many of the biggest real estate development operators in the Philippines are owned by Filipino entrepreneurs of Chinese ancestry. Large scale commercial real estate projects such as the Eton Centris in Pinyahan, the Shangri-La Plaza in Mandaluyong and the Tagaytay Highlands Golf Club and Resort development in Tagaytay City were testaments of such joint projects undertaken by Chinese Filipino real estate developers. These corporate partnerships were largely forged by Overseas Chinese business tycoons such as the investor Liem Sioe Liong, businessman Robert Kuok and dealmakers Andrew Gotianun, Henry Sy, George Ty and Lucio Tan.

Filipinos of Chinese ancestry also pioneered the Filipino shipping industry which eventually germinated into a major industry sector as a means of transporting goods cheaply and quickly between the islands. Filipino entrepreneurs of Chinese ancestry have remained dominant in the Philippines's maritime shipping industry and in sea transport as it was one of the few efficient methods of transporting goods cheaply and quickly across the country, with the Philippines geographically being an archipelago, comprising more than 1000 islands and inlets. There are 12 Chinese Filipino business families engaged in inter-island transport and shipping, particularly with the shipping of food products requiring refrigeration amounting to an aggregate capitalization of 10 billion pesos. Taiwanese expatriate investors have participated in various joint ventures, opening up new shipping lanes on the route between Manila and Cebu. Prominent shipping companies owned by Filipinos of Chinese ancestry include Cokaliong Shipping Lines, Gothong Lines, Lite Shipping Corporation, Sulpicio Lines which was associated with a tragedy that led to the deaths of hundreds and Trans-Asia Shipping Lines. One enterprising and pioneering Chinese Filipino entrepreneur was William Chiongbian, who established William Lines in 1949, which by the end of 1993, became the most profitable inter-island Filipino shipping line ranking first in terms of gross revenue generated as well as net income among the country's seven biggest shipping companies. Currently, the Filipino inter-island shipping industry is dominated by four Chinese-owned shipping firms led by William Chiongbian's William Lines. Likewise, Filipinos of Chinese ancestry also own all of the major airlines in the Philippines, including the flagship carrier Philippine Airlines, AirphilExpress, Cebu Pacific, South East Asian Airlines, Manila Air and Zest Air.

As the ethnic Chinese economic might grew, much of the indigenous Filipino majority were gradually driven out into poorer land on the hills, on the outskirts of major Filipino cities, or into the mountains. Disenchantment grew among the displaced indigenous Filipinos who felt they were unable compete with ethnic Chinese businesses. Underlying resentment and bitterness from the impoverished Filipino majority has been accumulating as there has been no existence of indigenous Filipino having any substantial business equity in the Philippines. Decades of free market liberalization brought virtually no economic benefit to the indigenous Filipino majority but rather the opposite resulting a subjugated indigenous Filipino majority underclass, where the vast majority still engage in rural peasantry, menial labor or domestic service and squatting. The Filipino government has dealt with this wealth disparity by establishing socialist and communist dictatorships or authoritarian regimes while pursuing a systematic and ruthless affirmative action campaigns giving privileges to allow the indigenous Filipino majority to gain a more equitable economic footing during the 1950s and 1960s. The rise of economic nationalism among the impoverished indigenous Filipino majority prompted by the Filipino government resulted in the passing of the Retail Trade Nationalization Law of 1954, where ethnic Chinese were barred and pressured to move out of the retail sector restricting engagement to Filipino citizens only. In addition, the Chinese were prevented from owning land by restricting land ownership to Filipinos only. Other restrictions on Chinese economic activities included limiting Chinese involvement in the import-export trade while trying to increase the indigenous Filipino involvement to gain a proportionate presence. In 1960, the Rice and Corn Nationalization Law was passed restricting trading, milling, and warehousing of rice and corn only to Filipinos while barring Chinese involvement, in which they initially had a significant presence. These policies ultimately backfired on the government as the laws had an overall negative impact on the government tax revenue which dropped significantly because the country's biggest share of taxpayers were Chinese, who eventually took their capital out of the country to invest elsewhere. The increased economic clout held in the hands of the Chinese has triggered suspicion, instability, ethnic hatred, and anti-Chinese hostility among the indigenous native Filipino majority towards the Chinese minority. Such hostility has resulted in the kidnapping of hundreds of Chinese Filipinos by native Filipinos since the 1990s. Many victims, often children are often brutally murdered, even after a ransom is paid. Numerous incidents of crimes such kidnap-for-ransom, extortion, and other forms of harassment were committed against the Chinese Filipino community starting in the early 1990s continues to this very day. Thousands of displaced Filipino hill tribes and aborigines continue to live in satellite shantytowns on the outskirts of Manila in economic destitution where two-thirds of the country's indigenous Filipinos live on less than 2 dollars per day in extreme poverty. Such hatred, envy, grievance, insecurity, and resentment is ready at any moment to be catalyzed by the indigenous Filipino majority as many Chinese Filipinos are subject to kidnapping, vandalism, murder, and violence. Anti-Chinese sentiment among the indigenous Filipino majority is deeply rooted in poverty but also feelings of resentment and exploitation are also exhibited among native and mestizo Filipinos blaming their socioeconomic failures on Chinese Filipinos.

Future trends
Most of the younger generations of pure Chinese Filipinos are descendants of Chinese who migrated during the 1800s onward – this group retains much of Chinese culture, customs, and work ethic (though not necessarily language), whereas almost all Chinese mestizos are descendants of Chinese who migrated even before the Spanish colonial period and have been integrated and assimilated into the general Philippine society as a whole.

There are four trends that the Chinese Filipino would probably undertake within a generation or so:
assimilation and integration, as in the case of Chinese Thais who eventually lost their genuine Chinese heritage and adopted Thai culture and language as their own
separation, where the Chinese Filipino community can be clearly distinguished from the other ethnic groups in the Philippines; reminiscent of most Chinese Malaysians
returning to the ancestral land, which is the current phenomenon of overseas Chinese returning to China
emigration to North America and Australasia, as in the case of some Chinese Malaysians and many Chinese Vietnamese (Hoa people)

During the 1970s, Fr. Charles McCarthy, an expert in Philippine-Chinese relations, observed that "the peculiarly Chinese content of the Philippine-Chinese subculture is further diluted in succeeding generations" and he made a prediction that "the time will probably come and it may not be far off, when, in this sense, there will no more 'Chinese' in the Philippines". This view is still controversial however, with the constant adoption of new cultures by Filipinos contradicting this thought.

Integration and assimilation

Assimilation is defined as the adoption of the cultural norms of the dominant or host culture, while integration is defined as the adoption of the cultural norms of the dominant or host culture while maintaining their culture of origin.

As of the present day, due to the effects of globalization in the Philippines, there has been a marked tendency to assimilate to Filipino lifestyles influenced by the US, among ethnic Chinese. This is especially true for younger Chinese Filipino living in Metro Manila who are gradually shifting to English as their preferred language, thus identifying more with Western culture, at the same time speaking Chinese among themselves. Similarly, as the cultural divide between Chinese Filipino and other Filipinos erode, there is a steady increase of intermarriages with native and mestizo Filipinos, with their children completely identifying with the Filipino culture and way of life. Assimilation is gradually taking place in the Philippines, albeit at a slower rate as compared to Thailand.

On the other hand, the largest Chinese Filipino organization, the Kaisa Para Sa Kaunlaran openly espouses eventual integration but not assimilation of the Chinese Filipino with the rest of Philippine society and clamors for maintaining Chinese language education and traditions.

Meanwhile, the general Philippine public is largely neutral regarding the role of the Chinese Filipino in the Philippines, and many have embraced Chinese Filipino as fellow Filipino citizens and even encouraged them to assimilate and participate in the formation of the Philippines' destiny.

Separation

Separation is defined as the rejection of the dominant or host culture in favor of preserving their culture of origin, often characterized by the presence of ethnic enclaves.

The recent rapid economic growth of both China and Taiwan as well as the successful business acumen of Overseas Chinese have fueled among many Chinese Filipino a sense of pride through immersion and regaining interest in Chinese culture, customs, values and language while remaining in the Philippines.

Despite the community's inherent ethnocentrism – there are no active proponents for political separation, such as autonomy or even independence, from the Philippines, partly due to the small size of the community relative to the general Philippine population, and the scattered distribution of the community throughout the archipelago, with only half residing in Metro Manila.

Returning to the ancestral land

Many Chinese-Filipino entrepreneurs and professionals have flocked to their ancestral homeland to partake of business and employment opportunities opened up by China's emergence as a global economic superpower.

As above, the fast economic growth of China and the increasing popularity of Chinese culture has also helped fan pro-China patriotism among a majority of Chinese Filipino who espouse 愛國愛鄉 (ài guó ài xiāng) sentiments (love of ancestral country and hometown). Some Chinese Filipino, especially those belonging to the older generation, still demonstrate ài guó ài xiāng by donating money to fund clan halls, school buildings, Buddhist temples and parks in their hometowns in China.

Emigration to North America and Australasia

During the 1990s to the early 2000s, Philippine economic difficulties and more liberal immigration policies in destination countries have led to well-to-do Chinese Filipino families to acquire North American or Australasian passports and send their children abroad to attend prestigious North America or Australasian Universities. Many of these children are opting to remain after graduation to start professional careers in North America or Australasia, like their Chinese brethren from other parts of Asia.

Many Philippine-educated Chinese Filipino from middle-class families are also migrating to North America and Australasia for economic advantages. Those who have family businesses regularly commute between North America (or Australasia) and the Philippines. In this way, they follow the well-known pattern of other Chinese immigrants to North America who lead "astronaut" lifestyles: family in North America, business in Asia.

With the increase in political stability and economic growth in Asia, this trend is becoming significantly less popular for Chinese Filipino.

Notable people

See also

China–Philippines relations
Chinese Filipinos who migrated to Mexico during the galleon trade
CHInoyTV, a TV program featuring the Chinese community in the Philippines
Filipinos in China
List of Chinese schools in the Philippines
Manila Chinese Cemetery
Sangley

Notes

References

Further reading
Amyot, Jacques, S.J. The Chinese Community of Manila: A Study of Adaptation of Chinese Familism to the Philippine Environment. Philippine Studies Program, Research Series No. 2, University of Chicago Department of Anthropology (mimeographed), 1960.

External links